Lyster is a municipality in the Centre-du-Québec region of the province of Quebec in Canada. It was created with the fusion of the Sainte-Anastasie parish and the village of Lyster in 1976.

See also 
Lyster

References

External links

Municipalities in Quebec
Incorporated places in Centre-du-Québec